Huila is one of the departments of Colombia. It is located in the southwest of the country, and its capital is Neiva.

Demography and Ethnography 
Huila is a department that has a population of 1,122,622 inhabitants, of which 679,667 (60.54%) people live in municipal capitals and 442,955 (39.46%) in the rest of the Huilense territory. This corresponds to 2.5% of the total Colombian population. The majority of the population is settled in the Magdalena valley, with epicenters in Neiva and Garzón due to the possibilities offered by the commercial-type agricultural economy, oil exploitation, the best provision of services and the road axes connected to the central axis that borders the Magdalena. The rest of the populations are located on the coffee belt, standing out Pitalito and La Plata, the North Subregion presents a decrease in its rural population, mainly attributable to the alterations of agricultural and oil activities on the landscape. The average population density in the department is 59.88 inhabitants / km2, with the highest densities in Neiva (223.72), Pitalito (200.1) and Garzón (162.45), and with the lowest in the municipalities of Colombia and Villavieja (7.83 and 10.91 respectively).

Ethnography 
According to DANE, the racial composition of Huila corresponds to: 98.43% is recognized as Whites and Mestizos while only 1.57% as an ethnic population (Amerindians and Afro/Mulattos) makes it one of the most Eurocentric and less diverse departments in terms of race or ethnicity in the country.

Geography

The south of the department is located in the Colombian Massif. The Cordillera Oriental is born in this place.

Colombia's third highest peak, the Nevado del Huila volcano, is located in the department of Huila.

The Magdalena River (also called Yuma River) is Colombia's largest river, begins in the department of Huila. Some of Huila's most important towns are located in the Magdalena River Valley. Betania is a dam located on the Magdalena river. A larger dam, El Quimbo, is planned for the same river.

Administrative divisions

Municipalities
 Acevedo
 Agrado
 Aipe
 Algeciras
 Altamira
 Baraya
 Campoalegre
 Colombia
 Elías
 Garzón
 Gigante
 Guadalupe
 Hobo
 Iquira
 Isnos
 La Argentina
 La Plata
 Nátaga
 Neiva (capital city)
 Oporapa
 Paicol
 Palermo
 Palestina
 Pital
 Pitalito
 Rivera
 Saladoblanco
 San Agustín
 Santa María
 Suaza
 Tarqui
 Tello
 Teruel
 Tesalia
 Timaná
 Villavieja
 Yaguará

References

External links 
 Government of Huila official website

Huila Department
Departments of Colombia
States and territories established in 1905
1905 establishments in Colombia